Mr Smith is a 1976 short film written and directed by Adrian Lyne and starring Peter Barkworth. It was often shown as a 'filler' in London's West End cinemas along with horror or soft porn films such as Emmanuelle. It was Lyne's second short film, following The Table (1973), and was well received at the London Film Festival.

Story
The film traces a day in the life of middle-aged Mr Smith (Barkworth), which ends with his suicide.

Cast
 Peter Barkworth
 Annette Crosbie
 Victoria Burgoyne
 Graham Ashley
 Myrtle Devenish
 Ingrid Hafner
 Carole Hayman
 Steve James
 Alan Lawrance
 Gerald McAllister
 Stella Tanner

References

External links

1976 films
1976 short films
Films directed by Adrian Lyne
British short films
Films about suicide
1970s English-language films